Euzopherodes ephestialis is a species of snout moth in the genus Euzopherodes. It was described by George Hampson in 1903. It is found in India and Pakistan.

The larvae feed on Loranthus species.

References

Moths described in 1903
Phycitini